Hugh Archibald Wyndham, 4th Baron Leconfield (4 October 1877 – 6 July 1963) was a British peer, politician and author. He succeeded his elder brother as fourth Baron Leconfield in 1952. He was the historian of the Wyndham family.

Biography

Wyndham was born at the family estate, Petworth House, in Sussex. A direct descendant of Sir John Wyndham, he was the fourth (but third surviving) son of Henry Wyndham, 2nd Baron Leconfield, and Constance Evelyn Primrose, daughter of Archibald Primrose, Lord Dalmeny. His grandfather, the first Baron Leconfield, was the adopted heir of George Wyndham, 3rd Earl of Egremont, from whom the family derived their considerable wealth.

Hugh was educated at Eton College and New College, Oxford.

In 1908, he married Maud Mary Lyttelton, daughter of Charles Lyttelton, 8th Viscount Cobham. She died in 1953, one year after he inherited the family titles from his older brother.

He did not move to the family estate in Petworth but primarily resided at Wyndham House in London. He died at the London Clinic in 1963, 11 years after inheriting the title.

Like his two elder brothers, Hugh had no children, and the title passed to his younger brother, Edward Wyndham.

Published works
 as The Hon. H.A. Wyndham (1933) Native Education : Ceylon, Java, Formosa, the Philippines, French Indo-China, and British Malaya (London: Milford). Problems of Imperial Trusteeship series.
. Problems of Imperial Trusteeship series.
 Problems of Imperial Trusteeship series.
 as The Hon. H.A. Wyndham (1939) A Family History, 1410-1688 : The Wyndhams of Norfolk and Somerset (London: Oxford).

References

1877 births
1963 deaths
Barons in the Peerage of the United Kingdom
Younger sons of barons
Hugh
English non-fiction writers
Alumni of New College, Oxford
People educated at Eton College
English male non-fiction writers